Manuel Alejandro Ormazábal Pino (born 10 March 1983) is a Chilean footballer that currently plays for Chilean Second Division club San Antonio Unido as defender.

Honours

Club
Provincial Osorno
 Primera B: 2007

Unión San Felipe
 Primera B: 2009
 Copa Chile: 2009

Rangers
 Primera B: 2011

External links
 
 

1983 births
Living people
Chilean footballers
Chilean people of Basque descent
Universidad de Concepción footballers
Deportes Temuco footballers
Club Deportivo Universidad Católica footballers
Deportes Concepción (Chile) footballers
Rangers de Talca footballers
Coquimbo Unido footballers
Provincial Osorno footballers
Unión San Felipe footballers
Cobreloa footballers
Chilean Primera División players
Primera B de Chile players
Footballers from Santiago
Association football midfielders